Carex vernacula is a species of sedge known by the common name native sedge.

Distribution
This sedge is native to the western United States, where it grows in moist mountain habitat in alpine climates and higher subalpine elevations. It often arises in cold pools of snowmelt.

Description
Carex vernacula produces clumps of erect stems 30 to 40 centimeters in maximum height, and sometimes forms colonies connected by rhizome networks. The inflorescence is a dense, tangled clump of flower spikes. The fruit is coated in a green-edged brown perigynium.

External links
Jepson Manual Treatment - Carex vernacula
USDA Plants Profile: Carex vernacula
Flora of North America
Carex vernacula - Photo gallery

vernacula
Alpine flora
Flora of the Western United States
Flora of California
Flora of Oregon
Flora of the Sierra Nevada (United States)
Flora of the West Coast of the United States
Plants described in 1893
Flora without expected TNC conservation status
Taxa named by Liberty Hyde Bailey